In coding theory, a covering code is a set of elements (called codewords) in a space, with the property that every element of the space is within a fixed distance of some codeword.

Definition  

A code  over an alphabet Q of size |Q| = q is called
q-ary R-covering code of length n
if for every word  there is a codeword 
such that the Hamming distance .
In other words, the spheres (or balls or rook-domains) of radius R
with respect to the Hamming metric around the codewords of C have to exhaust
the finite metric space .
The covering radius of a code C is the smallest R such that C is R-covering.
Every perfect code is a covering code of minimal size.

Example 

C = {0134,0223,1402,1431,1444,2123,2234,3002,3310,4010,4341} is a 5-ary 2-covering code of length 4.

Covering problem 

The determination of the minimal size  of a q-ary R-covering code of length n is a very hard problem. In many cases, only upper and lower bounds are known with a large gap between them.
Every construction of a covering code gives an upper bound on Kq(n, R).
Lower bounds include the sphere covering bound and 

Football pools problem 
A particular case is the football pools problem, based on football pool betting, where the aim is to come up with a betting system over n football matches that, regardless of the outcome, has at most R 'misses'. Thus, for n matches with at most one 'miss', a ternary covering, K3(n,1), is sought.

If  then 3n-k are needed, so for n = 4, k = 2, 9 are needed; for n = 13, k = 3, 59049 are needed.  The best bounds known as of 2011 are

Applications 
The standard work on covering codes lists the following applications.

Compression with distortion
Data compression
Decoding errors and erasures
Broadcasting in interconnection networks
Football pools
Write-once memories
Berlekamp-Gale game
Speech coding
Cellular telecommunications
Subset sums and Cayley graphs

References

External links 
 Literature on covering codes
 Bounds on 

Coding theory